Richardson Township may refer to:

 Richardson Township, Randolph County, Arkansas, in Randolph County, Arkansas
 Richardson Township, Morrison County, Minnesota
 Richardson Township, Butler County, Nebraska

Township name disambiguation pages